Aikana may refer to:
 Aikanã people, an ethnic group of Brazil
 Aikanã language, a language of Brazil

See also 
 Aikanaka (disambiguation)

Language and nationality disambiguation pages